Arthur is a city in Cass County, North Dakota, United States. The population was 328 at the 2020 census.

Geography

Demographics

2010 census
As of the census of 2010, there were 337 people, 130 households, and 82 families living in the city. The racial makeup of the city was 98.5% White and 1.5% from two or more races. Hispanic or Latino of any race were 0.6% of the population.

There were 130 households, of which 33.1% had children under the age of 18 living with them, 50.0% were married couples living together, 10.0% had a female householder with no husband present, 3.1% had a male householder with no wife present, and 36.9% were non-families. 34.6% of all households were made up of individuals, and 18.5% had someone living alone who was 65 years of age or older. The average household size was 2.35 and the average family size was 3.04.

The median age in the city was 43.6 years. 25.5% of residents were under the age of 18; 6.8% were between the ages of 18 and 24; 19% were from 25 to 44; 22.3% were from 45 to 64; and 26.4% were 65 years of age or older. The gender makeup of the city was 46.3% male and 53.7% female.

2000 census
As of the census of 2000, there were 402 people, 129 households, and 82 families living in the city. The population density was 265.2 people per square mile (102.1/km2). There were 140 housing units at an average density of 92.4 per square mile (35.6/km2). The racial makeup of the city was 94.53% White, 2.24% Native American, 1.24% from other races, and 1.99% from two or more races. Hispanic or Latino of any race were 5.22% of the population.

The top six ancestry groups in the city are German (49.3%), Norwegian (32.8%), Swedish (13.9%), Irish (10.7%), English (8.7%), French (6.0%).

There were 129 households, out of which 38.8% had children under the age of 18 living with them, 56.6% were married couples living together, 6.2% had a female householder with no husband present, and 35.7% were non-families. 32.6% of all households were made up of individuals, and 17.8% had someone living alone who was 65 years of age or older. The average household size was 2.56 and the average family size was 3.30.

In the city, the population was spread out, with 28.9% under the age of 18, 2.5% from 18 to 24, 23.6% from 25 to 44, 15.9% from 45 to 64, and 29.1% who were 65 years of age or older. The median age was 40 years. For every 100 females there were 85.3 males. For every 100 females ag 18 and over, there were 83.3 males.

The median income for a household in the city was $36,250, and the median income for a family was $41,875. Males had a median income of $28,750 versus $19,583 for females. The per capita income for the city was $13,948. About 7.9% of families and 9.1% of the population were below the poverty line, including 15.9% of those under age 18 and 11.7% of those age 65 or over.

Notable person
 Doug Burgum, current Governor of North Dakota, born in Arthur

References

Cities in Cass County, North Dakota
Cities in North Dakota
Populated places established in 1881
1881 establishments in Dakota Territory